Gdańsk Jasień railway station is a railway station serving the city of Gdańsk, in the Pomeranian Voivodeship, Poland. The station opened on 1 September 2015 and is located on the Gdańsk Wrzeszcz–Gdańsk Osowa railway. The train services are operated by SKM Tricity as part of the Pomorska Kolej Metropolitalna (PKM).

Train services
The station is served by the following services:

Pomorska Kolej Metropolitalna services (R) Gdynia Główna — Gdańsk Osowa — Gdańsk Port Lotniczy (Airport) — Gdańsk Wrzeszcz
Pomorska Kolej Metropolitalna services (R) Kartuzy — Gdańsk Port Lotniczy (Airport) — Gdańsk Główny 
Pomorska Kolej Metropolitalna services (R) Kościerzyna — Gdańsk Port Lotniczy (Airport) — Gdańsk Wrzeszcz — Gdynia Główna

Public transport
Bus services call at Jasień PKM. The following services call here:

127, 129, 130, 155

References 

 This article is based upon a translation of the Polish language version as of November 2016.

External links

Railway stations in Poland opened in 2015
Jasien